Jurij Slatkonja (also Jurij Chrysippus, Slovenian: Jurij Slatkonja;  21 March 1456 – 26 April 1522) was a Carniolan choirmaster and the first residential Bishop of Vienna. He was also the first owner of an ex libris among the Slovenes. His crest contained a golden horse, based on a false etymology of his surname (Slovene slat [≈ zlat] 'golden' + konja [≈ konj] 'horse'). (The surname actually refers to someone that enjoys sweet food.)

Life
Born in Ljubljana, Slatkonja studied in Ljubljana, in 1474 in Ingolstadt, and then starting in 1475 in Vienna, where he received a bachelor's degree in 1477 at the Academy of Fine Arts. In 1495, he was a chaplain and cantor at the court in Vienna; he was also the canon and provost of the Diocese of Ljubljana. In 1498, he was appointed the singing master of the choir later known as the Vienna Boys' Choir. In 1499, he was named the second provost of the Novo Mesto College Chapter. In 1513 he was given the position of the Bishop of Vienna, although he continued to work as the main music organiser in the city and probably also himself composed.

Legacy
As a leader who fostered a bridge between faith and art, he had left a legacy in Vienna as well as in Slovenia. In 2022, Slovenia celebrated the 500th anniversary of his death. The "Jurij Slatkonja Conservatory of Music" (Konservatorij za glasbo Jurij Slatkonja, founded by the Diocese of Novo Mesto, is named after him.

References

External links 

1456 births
1522 deaths
Carniolan composers
Slovenian conductors (music)
Male conductors (music)
Carniolan Roman Catholic priests
Slovenian Roman Catholic bishops
Clergy from Ljubljana
Bishops of Vienna
16th-century Roman Catholic bishops in Austria